The Cloud County Veterans Memorial is a monument located in Concordia, Kansas.  The memorial includes an eternal flame that has been burning since the monument was established on November 11, 1968.  The memorial is located in the northwest corner of the county courthouse square.

The engraved plaque on the memorial reads:

Image gallery

References

External links
 Cloud County Tourism page

Buildings and structures in Cloud County, Kansas
Monuments and memorials in Kansas
Tourist attractions in Cloud County, Kansas